The Drako GTE is an electric luxury sports sedan manufactured by Drako Motors.

History
In August 2019, the American company Drako Motors presented its first series vehicle in the form of an electric full-size luxury sedan.

The GTE is based on the Karma Revero GT model (a derivative of the Fisker Karma). Similarly to it, it adopted the characteristic proportions of the oblong bonnet, massive wheel arches and a short rear overhang. The front apron has a large imitation of the air intake in the shape of a rounded hexagon, while the headlights took the form of aggressively stylized. The GTE was released in 2020 in a limited series of 25 copies. The price per unit is approximately US $ 1.2 million.

Specifications
The GTE has a drive system of which consists of four electric motors with a power of  each. The 90 kWh battery allows to reach  of range on a single charge.

References

Full-size vehicles
Luxury vehicles
Sports sedans
Electric cars
Cars introduced in 2019
2020s cars